Tractatus de superstitionibus is a title shared by two different medieval literary works by the following:
Nicholas Magni (1405)
Martin of Arles (1515)